Brachyachne is a genus of African, Australian, and Southeast Asian plants in the grass family.

 Species

See also 
 List of Poaceae genera

References 

Chloridoideae
Poaceae genera